Caruthersville is a city in and the county seat of Pemiscot County, Missouri, United States, located along the Mississippi River in the Bootheel region of the state's far southeast. The population was 5,562, according to the 2020 census.

History
Caruthersville lies in Missouri's Bootheel on the Mississippi River. The word "Pemiscot" comes from the word  meaning "liquid mud" in the Fox language. Mississippi waters have frequently flooded the flatlands, creating fertile alluvial land valued for farming. Settling the floodplain has resulted in periodic problems for residents, as there are regular floods despite (and because of) elaborate constructed systems of levees and flood controls.

Native Americans inhabited the land of the Caruthersville area for thousands of years before European settlement. The Mississippian culture built huge earthwork mounds throughout the Mississippi Valley. One such earthwork remains in this county, rising 270 feet above sea level about four miles southwest of Caruthersville. It stands in contrast to the surrounding delta-like plain.

In 1857 John Hardeman Walker and G. W. Bushey laid out and platted the town of Caruthersville. The town was named for Samuel Caruthers, who first represented the area in the US Congress.

The City of Caruthersville was incorporated on May 18, 1874.  The first few decades of the town's growth can be documented through Sanborn maps, which recorded building ownership, materials, and use.

In 1893, Missouri's General Assembly created the Saint Francis Levee District to construct protection for that part of the Saint Francis River basin lying within the counties of Dunklin, New Madrid, and Pemiscot. This act authorized taxes for the purpose of building, repairing, protecting, and maintaining levees in the district.

20th century to present
White violence against African Americans increased in the late 19th and early 20th centuries as they were pushing them out of the political system and voting across the South. Whites lynched four men in Caruthersville: D. Malone and W.J. Mooneyhon on May 3, 1903; and A.B. Richardson and Benjamin Woods on October 11, 1911.

Steel cages are one of the oldest form of enclosures used in professional wrestling. The earliest known "steel cage matches" of any kind took place on January 9, 1936 in Caruthersville, Missouri, in a card that included two such "chicken wire fence" matches between Lon Chaney and Otto Ludwig, and Joe Dillman vs. Charles Sinkey. These matches took place in a ring surrounded by chicken wire, in order to keep the athletes inside, and prevent any potential interference.

In February 1969, construction began on a bridge across the Mississippi at Caruthersville. Completed in 1976 and connecting with Dyersburg, Tennessee, it is the only bridge to cross the Mississippi River between Cairo, Illinois and Memphis, Tennessee. It is a single-tower cantilever bridge carrying Interstate 155 and U.S. Route 412.

During the night of April 2, 2006, 60% of Caruthersville was severely damaged or destroyed by a string of tornadoes that passed through the Midwestern United States. At least two persons were confirmed killed in Pemiscot County as a result of the tornado. On Monday morning, local police, state troopers, and national guard had barred entrance into Caruthersville and issued it as a "no fly zone" to anyone who was not a resident, an emergency worker, or a member of the newsmedia. According to the emergency management director from a nearby county, as many as 1,500 people were displaced by the storm, which struck the southwest side of the city. 

As reported by Caruthersville's then-mayor, Diane Sayre, there were no confirmed fatalities within city limits, but electricity and water services were disabled. Several churches, landmarks, and schools were destroyed or severely damaged, including St. John's Episcopal, Jesus Name Tabernacle, Faith Missionary Baptist, Caruthersville Municipal Airport, Caruthersville Cotton Warehouse, the Boy's and Girl's Club of the Bootheel, Knox's Drive In, the Kwik Chek, Caruthersville High School, and Caruthersville Middle School.

Geography
Caruthersville is located at  (36.184723, -89.661404). The city is located in the state's Bootheel, along the western bank of the Mississippi River and within the seismically active New Madrid Seismic Zone. The Caruthersville Bridge is the only bridge crossing the river between Cairo, Illinois and Memphis, Tennessee.

Climate
The climate in this area is characterized by hot, humid summers and generally mild to cool winters.  According to the Köppen Climate Classification system, Caruthersville has a humid subtropical climate, abbreviated "Cfa" on climate maps.

Demographics

2020 census

As of the 2020 United States Census, there were 5,562 people, 2,360 households, and 1,352 families residing in the city.

2010 census
At the 2010 census, there were 6,168 people, 2,454 households and 1,567 families living in the city. The racial makeup was 63.89% White, 33.09% Black or African American, 0.28% Native American, 0.19% Asian, 0.11% Native Hawaiian or Pacific Islander, 0.76% from other races, and 1.67% from two or more races. Hispanic or Latino of any race were 2.35% of the population.

There were 2,454 households, of which 31.6% had children under the age of 18 living with them, 35.3% were married couples living together, 22.9% had a female householder with no husband present, 5.6% had a male householder with no wife present, and 36.1% were non-families. 31.5% of all households were made up of individuals, and 12.7% had someone living alone who was 65 years of age or older. The average household size was 2.47 and the average family size was 3.10.

The median age was 34.2 years. 29.5% of residents were under the age of 18; 9.1% were between the ages of 18 and 24; 23.4% were from 25 to 44; 23.9% were from 45 to 64; and 14.1% were 65 years of age or older. The gender makeup was 46.6% male and 53.4% female.

2000 census
At the 2000 census, there were 6,760 people, 2,643 households and 1,723 families living in the city. The population density was 1,290.8 per square mile (498.1 per km2). There were 2,999 housing units at an average density of 572.7 per square mile (221.0 per km2). The racial makeup was 66.08% White, 31.41% African American, 0.13% Native American, 0.53% Asian, 0.03% Pacific Islander, 0.70% from other races, and 1.12% from two or more races. Hispanic or Latino of any race were 1.66% of the population.

There were 2,643 households, of which 35.8% had children under the age of 18 living with them, 40.0% were married couples living together, 21.2% had a female householder with no husband present, and 34.8% were non-families. 30.8% of all households were made up of individuals, and 14.7% had someone living alone who was 65 years of age or older. The average household size was 2.53 and the average family size was 3.17.

32.8% of the population were under the age of 18, 9.6% from 18 to 24, 24.7% from 25 to 44, 19.3% from 45 to 64, and 13.6% who were 65 years of age or older. The median age was 31 years. For every 100 females, there were 86.3 males. For every 100 females age 18 and over, there were 79.8 males.

The median household income was $19,601 and the median family income was $23,454. Males had a median income of $25,821 and females $17,434. The per capita income was $12,034. About 28.1% of families and 35.7% of the population were below the poverty line, including 50.3% of those under age 18 and 23.4% of those age 65 or over.

Education
Caruthersville 18 School District operates one elementary school, one middle school, and Caruthersville High School.

The town has a lending library, the Caruthersville Public Library.

Government

 List of Caruthersville mayors

Economy 

Major resources for the Caruthersville area include commerce supplied by the Mississippi river barge and transport industry as well as agriculture which accounts for 60% of the local economy. Large portions of the cash crops grown in the area, rice, soy beans and cotton are sent through the Mississippi River transportation industry to distribution points along the Mississippi delta region. There is now a riverboat casino in Caruthersville which has revived the local economy and provided a new source of tourist revenue.

Architecture 
The city of Caruthersville has the historic Caruthersville Water Tower which was built between 1902 and 1903.  It is one of three in the nation with the appearance of a lighthouse with the other two located in Indiana and Louisiana.  This one is on the National Register of Historic Places.

Notable people
 Eddie Acuff, actor, stage and screen
 John B. England, World War II fighter ace
 Donna Hightower, singer, songwriter
 Cedric Antonio Kyles, aka Cedric the Entertainer
 Wendell Mayes, screenwriter, playwright
 James Oliver, zoologist and herpetologist
 Clarke Reed, businessman
 John M. Riggs, US Army General
 Margaret Scoggin, librarian
 Reggie Young, musician

References

External links
 City of Caruthersville
 Caruthersville Public Library
 
 Historic maps of Caruthersville in the http://dl.mospace.umsystem.edu/mu/islandora/object/mu%3A138745 Sanborn Maps of Missouri Collection] at the University of Missouri

Cities in Missouri
Missouri populated places on the Mississippi River
Cities in Pemiscot County, Missouri
County seats in Missouri
Populated places established in 1857
1857 establishments in Missouri